The Battle of Castañares was an 1821 battle of the Argentine Civil Wars. The cabildo of Salta deposed the governor Martín Miguel de Güemes on May 24. He returned to the city on May 30. All the cavalry of the city switched sides to support Güemes, and the remaining forces dispersed. Thus, Güemes troops entered to the city unopposed.

Castanares
1821 in Argentina

Castañares
History of Salta Province